The Liberal Party (Partido Liberal) of Chile was a Chilean political party created by a faction of pipiolos in 1849. After the conservative victory in the Chilean Civil War of 1829 the liberals became the principal opposition party to the Conservative Party. During the Liberal Party's early history one of its main goal was to create a new constitution to replace the Chilean Constitution of 1833. Rigged election helped to prevent the Liberal Party's presidential candidates to be elected until 1861, during that time elements of the liberal party made attempts to overthrow the government, these were the Revolution of 1851 and the Revolution of 1859. These failed insurrections led many liberals to emigrate, among them Benjamín Vicuña Mackenna. In 1863 a group of liberal split off to form the Radical Party which would hold power from 1938 to 1952. Originally an anticlericalist party that championed classical liberalism, the liberals later became a right-wing party.

In 1966 the Liberal Party joined with their old antagonists, the United Conservative Party, to form the National Party.

Presidents elected under Liberal Party 
 1871 - Federico Errázuriz Zañartu
 1876 - Aníbal Pinto
 1881 - Domingo Santa María
 1886 - José Manuel Balmaceda
 1896 - Federico Errázuriz Echaurren
 1901 - Germán Riesco
 1910 - Ramón Barros Luco
 1920 - Arturo Alessandri
 1932 - Arturo Alessandri

Presidential candidates 
The following is a list of the presidential candidates supported by the Liberal Party or the pipiolos. (Information gathered from the Archive of Chilean Elections).
1829: Francisco Antonio Pinto (won), Joaquín Vicuña (lost)
1831: none
1836: none
1841: Francisco Antonio Pinto (lost)
1846: none
1851: José María de la Cruz (lost)
1856: none
1861: José Joaquín Pérez (won)
1866: José Joaquín Pérez (won)
1871: Federico Errázuriz Zañartu (won), José Tomás de Urmeneta (lost)
1876: Aníbal Pinto (won)
1881: Domingo Santa María (won), Manuel Baquedano (lost)
1886: José Manuel Balmaceda (won)
June 1891: Claudio Vicuña (won)
October 1891: Jorge Montt (won)
1896: Vicente Reyes (lost)
1901: Germán Riesco (won)
1906: Pedro Montt (won)
1910: Ramón Barros Luco (won)
1915: Javier Ángel Figueroa (lost)
1920: Alliance faction: Arturo Alessandri (won), Union faction: Luis Barros Borgoño (lost)
1925: Emiliano Figueroa (won)
1927: none
1931: Juan Esteban Montero (won), Arturo Alessandri (lost)
1932: Arturo Alessandri (won), Enrique Zañartu Prieto (lost)
1938: Gustavo Ross (lost)
1942: Carlos Ibáñez (lost)
1946: Fernando Alessandri (lost)
1952: Arturo Matte (lost)
1958: Jorge Alessandri (won)
1964: Eduardo Frei Montalva (won)

See also 
:Category:Liberal Party (Chile, 1849) politicians
 Liberal Party of Chile (2013)

Liberal parties in Chile
Defunct political parties in Chile
Political parties established in 1849
Political parties disestablished in 1966
1849 establishments in Chile
1966 disestablishments in Chile